The 2018 Richmond Spiders football team represented the University of Richmond in the 2018 NCAA Division I FCS football season. They were led by second-year head coach Russ Huesman and played their home games at E. Claiborne Robins Stadium. The Spiders were a member of the Colonial Athletic Association. They finished the season 4–7, 2–6 in CAA play to finish in a tie for tenth place.

Previous season
The Spiders finished the 2017 season 6–5, 4–4 in CAA play to finish in sixth place.

Preseason

CAA Poll
In the CAA preseason poll released on July 24, 2018, the Spiders were predicted to finish in seventh place.

Preseason All-CAA Team
The Spiders had four players selected to the preseason all-CAA team.

Offense

Dejon Brissett – WR

John Yarbrough – OL

Defense

Andrew Clyde – DL

Special teams

Griffin Trau – K

Award watch lists

Schedule

Source: Schedule

Game summaries

at Virginia

Fordham

at Saint Francis (PA)

at Stony Brook

James Madison

Delaware

at Albany

at Elon

Villanova

Maine

at William & Mary

References

Richmond
Richmond Spiders football seasons
Richmond Spiders football